Toldos Yeshurun Yeshiva is an educational institution for Russian-speaking baalei teshuva in Jerusalem. The yeshiva is located inside the Mir yeshiva, and avreichim from the Mir teach the yeshiva's students on a regular basis.

The yeshiva is one of the projects of the Toldos Yeshurun organization. Its goal is to bridge the gap of knowledge and skills in Torah learning between newly observant Russian-speaking young men and their peers who were brought up in the yeshiva system. After a year or two at this yeshiva, graduates go on to study in the best Israeli yeshivos, or marry and continue their studies in a kollel.

The yeshiva, as the organization of Toldos Yeshurun, was founded by Rabbi Yitzchok Zilber. His son, Rabbi Ben Zion Zilber, continues to lead the organization after Rabbi Yitzchok's passing.

Studies take place from 9:15 in the morning until lunch at 1:15 pm and continue from 3:30 pm until 7 pm and from 8:30 pm until 10:30 pm.

Forms of learning in the yeshiva are the shiur (lecture) and chavruta (learning partner). Part of the classes are held in Russian, and other classes, for the more advanced, are held in Hebrew.

A kollel for young married Russian-speaking men operates within the framework of the yeshiva.

External links 
  The official Toldos Yeshurun website about the yeshiva
  Toldos Yeshurun main website in English
  Toldos Yeshurun main website in Russian

Educational organizations based in Israel